Peggy Blow is an American actress, best known for her role as Marisol Martinez, Ruby's Abuela on the Netflix series On My Block. Blow has made many appearances on television shows since the 1970s, and has been cast in several films.

Career
Blow began her career in theater.

In 2018, Blow was cast as Ruby's Abuela in the Netflix series On My Block. She has stated that her character as Ruby's Abuela reminds her of her three aunts in Chicago.

Filmography

References

External links

1952 births
Living people
20th-century American actresses
21st-century American women